The Laichtín Naofa Céilí Band is a former céilí band based in Milltown Malbay, County Clare, Ireland.

History
In 1951, the Comhaltas Ceoltóirí Éireann was founded. This organisation established many local branches, including one in Milltown Malbay. Soon after its foundation, it formed the Laichtín Naofa Céilí Band. The band existed from 1954 to 1962.

It served both the parishes of Kilfarboy (Milltown Malbay) and Kilmurry Ibrickane (Quilty, Mullagh, Coore). It took its name from St. Laichtín, to whom a Holy well is dedicated on the border of both parishes.

The band took part in several competitions, including the 1955 Fleadh Cheoil in Loughrea (3rd place), 1956 1958 Munster Championship in Longford (winner) 1959 Oireachtas na Gaeilge (winner).

The band was the successor of the Milford House Céilí Band (1937-1940s).

Members
Incomplete overview of musicians once playing with the band.

Fiddlers
 Paddy Galvin
 Junior Crehan
 James Flynn
 Christy Dixon

Accordions
 Paddy Joe McMahon
 Michael Sexton Sr.

Uilleann Pipes
 Willie Clancy
 Martin Talty

Flutes
 J C Talty
 Josie Hayes
 Michael Falsey

Banjo
 Jimmy Ward

Double Bass
 Angela Merry

Piano
 Colm O'Connor

Drums
 Martin Malone
 Paddy Malone
 Aidan Vaughan

Importance
After the Public Dance Halls Act 1936, that outlawed the traditional country house dances, most musicians suddenly had no place to gather and play. The band was a community-based band in a rural tradition.

Junior Crehan described is importance as:

Recordings
LP
 Come to an Irish Dance Party, 1959

CD's
 Come to an Irish Dance Party, 2008. A re-issue of the historic recording of 1959 digitally re-mastered.

See also
 The Kilfenora Céilí Band
 The Tulla Céilí Band

References

External links
 Around The Floor & Mind The Dresser (YouTube)

Irish culture
Musical groups from County Clare
Irish dance
Milltown Malbay